Joseph Lawrence Kresky (April 27, 1906 – December 24, 1988) was an American football guard and offensive tackle who played for the Boston Braves, Philadelphia Eagles and Pittsburgh Pirates of the NFL.

Life
Kresky was born in Marinette, Wisconsin to Michael Kresky and Agnes Berg Barnosky Kresky, German immigrants, on April 27, 1906. He died on December 24, 1988.

Career
Kresky attended Marinette High School, where he was a star football player. After high school, he played college football for the University of Wisconsin. Kresky played in the National Football League for the Boston Braves, the Philadelphia Eagles, and the Pittsburgh Pirates.

References

People from Marinette, Wisconsin
Players of American football from Wisconsin
American football offensive linemen
Wisconsin Badgers football players
Boston Braves (NFL) players
Philadelphia Eagles players
Pittsburgh Pirates (football) players
1906 births
1988 deaths